is a Japanese football player. He plays for MIO Biwako Shiga.

Playing career
Toshikazu Soya joined to Albirex Niigata Singapore in 2012. In September, he moved to Grulla Morioka and played to 2015. In 2016, he moved to Saurcos Fukui, then he changed to MIO Biwako Shiga for 2017 season.

Club statistics
Updated to 20 February 2017.

References

External links

1989 births
Living people
Ryutsu Keizai University alumni
Association football people from Tokyo
Japanese footballers
J3 League players
Iwate Grulla Morioka players
Association football forwards